Katia Mann (born Katharina Hedwig Pringsheim; July 24, 1883 – April 25, 1980) was the youngest child and only daughter (among four sons) of the German Jewish mathematician and artist Alfred Pringsheim and his wife Hedwig Pringsheim, who was an actress in Berlin before her marriage. Katia was also a granddaughter of the writer and women's rights activist Hedwig Dohm. Her twin brother Klaus was a conductor, composer, music writer and music pedagogue, active in Germany and Japan. She married the writer Thomas Mann.

Life

Katia was born in Feldafing near Munich, into one of the wealthiest families in Germany. She was the granddaughter of German-Jewish industrialist Rudolf Pringsheim and the great-niece of the banker Hugo Pringsheim. At the age of 21, in the fall of 1904, she aborted her studies of physics and mathematics on the request of her mother and aunt, to marry the writer Thomas Mann on February 11, 1905, in Munich. She continued her studies as a guest student for another four semesters. Katia and Thomas Mann had six children (see section "Children" infra). Katia later converted to her husband's Lutheranism.

Children

Illness, exile and death 
Katia Mann became ill in autumn 1911, a year after Monika's birth. The illness was first suspected to be tuberculosis, but later X-ray examinations could not find any physical changes. Her mother, Hedwig, put the illness down to exhaustion.  Katia had given birth to four children and suffered two miscarriages in less than five years. In addition, she typed for her husband and arranged his appointments on top of the tasks of a large household. Hedwig realised that her daughter needed rest, and in January 1912, Katia was one of the first patients to be admitted to the Wald Sanatorium in Davos, Switzerland. Thomas Mann's visits to her there inspired his novel The Magic Mountain. Up to May, 1914, Katia spent several months in sanatoriums, which (according to her) strengthened her so that she could "stand it all".

While the Mann family lived in exile, Katia Mann continued to take care of her six children and husband. She was not just a strong woman but a unifying figure that kept the family together. She educated her children and was her husband's office manager. She outlived three of her children (Klaus, Erika and Michael) and her husband. She died in Kilchberg near Zürich.

Thomas Mann made a sort of "portrait" of her in his novel Royal Highness.

See also
Dohm–Mann family tree

Notes

References
Michael Mann (editor): Katia Mann: My Unwritten Memoirs. (Katia Mann: Meine ungeschriebenen Memoiren.) S.Fischer, Frankfurt 1974, ; Fischer-Taschenbuch-Verlag, Frankfurt 2000, 
English edition: Katia Mann: Unwritten Memories, edited by Elisabeth Plessen and Michael Mann, translated by Hunter and Hildegarde Hannum. Alfred A. Knopf, 1975. 
Inge and Walter Jens: Mrs. Thomas Mann. The life of Katharina Pringsheim. (Frau Thomas Mann. Das Leben der Katharina Pringsheim.) Rowohlt. Reinbek, 2003. 
Kirsten Jüngling / Brigitte Roßbeck: Katia Mann. The Wizard's Wife. (Katia Mann. Die Frau des Zauberers.) Propyläen. 2003.

External links

Thomas Mann Collection. Yale Collection of German Literature, Beinecke Rare Book and Manuscript Library.

1883 births
1980 deaths
German people of Jewish descent
Jewish emigrants from Nazi Germany to the United States
German Lutherans
Katia
People from Starnberg (district)
People from the Kingdom of Bavaria
German twins
20th-century Lutherans